Khajan-e Do Dang (also Romanized as Khājān-e Do Dāng; also known as Khājān) is a village in Howmeh Rural District, in the Central District of Rasht County, Gilan Province, Iran. At the 2006 census, its population was 143, in 39 families.

References 

Populated places in Rasht County